Wongsapat Silahiranrat (born 29 July 1995) is a Thai professional footballer who plays for Lampang.

References

External links
 

1995 births
Living people
Wongsapat Silahiranrat
Association football midfielders
Wongsapat Silahiranrat
Wongsapat Silahiranrat
Wongsapat Silahiranrat
Wongsapat Silahiranrat